La Chapelle-d'Armentières is a commune of the Nord department in northern France. It is part of the Métropole Européenne de Lille.

Population

Heraldry

See also
Communes of the Nord department

References

Chapelledarmentieres
French Flanders